The 1939 World Archery Championships was the 9th edition of the event. It was held in Oslo, Norway from 31 July to 5 August 1939 and was organised by World Archery Federation (FITA).

It was the last edition of the World Championships until 1946.

Medals summary

Recurve

Medals table

References

External links
 World Archery website
 Complete results

World Championship
World Archery
A
World Archery Championships
International sports competitions in Oslo
July 1939 sports events
August 1939 sports events
1930s in Oslo